The Overton Islands are a small chain of islands in Lake Mead, Nevada, in the Lake Mead National Recreation Area. The islands are located in the Overton Arm of the lake, about four miles southeast of Echo Bay. The largest island is less than a mile in length.

External links
 Photos of Overton Islands

References

Landforms of Clark County, Nevada
Lake islands of Nevada